The 1960 Republican National Convention was held in Chicago, Illinois, from July 25 to July 28, 1960, at the International Amphitheatre. It was the 14th and most recent time overall that Chicago hosted the Republican National Convention, more times than any other city.

The convention nominated Vice President Richard M. Nixon for president and former Senator Henry Cabot Lodge Jr. of Massachusetts for vice president.

The Presidency
By the time the Republican convention opened, Nixon had no opponents for the nomination. The highlight of the convention was the speech by U.S. Senator Barry Goldwater of Arizona removing himself from the race, in which he called on conservatives to "take back" the party. Nixon won easily, earning 1,321 votes to 10 for Goldwater. At the convention, Nixon promised that he would visit every state during his campaign.

The Vice Presidency

After winning the presidential nomination, Nixon considered several candidates for the vice presidential nomination. Incumbent President Dwight D. Eisenhower strongly supported Henry Cabot Lodge Jr., the United States Ambassador to the United Nations. Though Lodge was not viewed by Republicans as a charismatic speaker, his foreign policy experience as well as his longtime Republican Party ties as a descendant of the Lodge family made him an appealing candidate.

Lodge was unpopular with the conservative wing of the party, who regarded him as a Northeastern moderate. As a result of the conservatives' coolness toward Lodge, Nixon strongly considered conservative Minnesota Representative Walter Judd and U.S. Senator Thruston Morton of Kentucky, an establishment Republican who was more moderate than Judd but had a high profile as chairman of the Republican National Committee.

Other candidates Nixon considered include:

 Robert B. Anderson, U.S. Treasury Secretary from Texas
 Prescott S. Bush, U.S. Senator from Connecticut, and father of future 41st President George H.W. Bush
 Everett M. Dirksen, U.S. Senate Minority Leader from Illinois
 Arthur S. Flemming, U.S. HEW Secretary from Ohio
 Gerald R. Ford, U.S. Representative from Michigan (Would become Nixon's Vice President in 1973, and succeed him to the presidency upon his resignation in 1974.)
 Barry M. Goldwater, U.S. Senator from Arizona (Would be nominated for President in 1964)
 Alfred M. Gruenther, former NATO Supreme Commander from Nebraska
 Charles A. Halleck, U.S. House Minority Leader from Indiana
 Neil H. McElroy, former Secretary of Defense from Ohio
 James P. Mitchell, U.S. Labor Secretary from New Jersey
 Charles H. Percy, businessman from Illinois
 Nelson A. Rockefeller, Governor of New York
 William P. Rogers, U.S. Attorney General from Maryland
 Hugh D. Scott, U.S. Senator from Pennsylvania
 Frederick A. Seaton, U.S. Interior Secretary from Nebraska
 William G. Stratton, Governor of Illinois
 Philip Willkie, son of Wendell Willkie, the party's 1940 presidential candidate and member of the Indiana House of Representatives

After deciding on Lodge, Nixon participated in a closed session with party leaders, who concurred with his preference. After the session, Nixon announced his choice publicly, and the convention ratified it.

General election
The Nixon-Lodge ticket lost the 1960 election to the Democratic ticket of John F. Kennedy and Lyndon B. Johnson.

See also
History of the United States Republican Party
List of Republican National Conventions
U.S. presidential nomination convention
1960 Democratic National Convention
1960 United States presidential election

References

External links
 Republican Party platform of 1960 at The American Presidency Project
 Nixon nomination acceptance speech for President at RNC (transcript) at The American Presidency Project
Universal newsreel footage of the convention
 Video of Nixon nomination acceptance speech for President at RNC from C-SPAN (via YouTube)
 Audio of Nixon nomination acceptance speech for President at RNC
 Video of Lodge nomination acceptance speech for Vice President at RNC from C-SPAN (via YouTube)

Republican National Conventions
1960 United States presidential election
Political conventions in Chicago
1960 in Illinois
Articles containing video clips
1960 conferences
July 1960 events in the United States